Barison II or Barisone II (died 10 June 1191) was the giudice of Logudoro from 1153 to 1186. He was the son and successor of Gonario II, who retired to the monastery of Clairvaux to live out his days.

Barisone's mother was the Pisan Maria and because of this he had the support of the Pisan citizens of the realm. In October 1163, his brother Peter succeeded Constantine II of Cagliari as his daughter's husband. He was soon opposed by Barisone II of Arborea, who expelled him from Cagliari, and he fled to Torres and the protection of his brother. Together and with Pisan support, the brothers invaded Cagliari in March 1164, reconquering the city, and then Arborea in April, where they holed up Barisone in his castle of Cabras.

Though he was allied to Pisa through his mother and his allies in the war against Arborea, he was constrained to turn to Genoa later that year. In 1166, Barisone and Peter travelled to Pisa to explain the bloody reprisals of the citizens against the Pisans in Ottana. After that he officially abandoned Pisa and signed a treaty with Genoa. In 1168, a treaty negotiated by Nuvolone Alberici between Genoa and Arborea on one side and Pisa, Torres, and Cagliari on the other restored lands lost to Arborea.

In 1183, Pisa reoccupied Cagliari, but in 1186, Barisone returned to his old allies after the death of his brother.

In 1170, he had appointed his son Constantine II as co-ruler. His daughter Susanna married Andrea Doria (a relative of the famous sixteenth-century admiral). In 1186, he retired to the monastery of San Giovanni in Messina, leaving Torres to his son. His younger son Comita III later held the throne of Torres.

Notes

Sources
Ferrabino, Aldo (ed). Dizionario Biografico degli Italiani: VI Baratteri – Bartolozzi. Rome, 1964.
Scano, D. "Serie cronol. dei giudici sardi." Arch. stor. sardo. 1939.
Besta, E. and Somi, A. I condaghi di San Nicolas di Trullas e di Santa Maria di Bonarcado. Milan, 1937.

1191 deaths
Judges (judikes) of Logudoro
Year of birth unknown